Chungara Revista de Antropología Chilena (English: The Journal of Chilean Anthropology) is a peer-reviewed academic journal on anthropology and archaeology with particular, but not exclusive, focus on the Andean region. The journal is published by the Departamento de Antropología (Universidad de Tarapacá) and the editor-in-chief is Vivien G. Standen (Universidad de Tarapacá).

Abstracting and indexing 
The journal is abstracted and indexed in the Social Sciences Citation Index, Current Contents/Social & Behavioral Sciences, and Scopus. According to the Journal Citation Reports, the journal has a 2014 impact factor of 0.694.

References

External links 
 

Anthropology journals
Multilingual journals
Academic journals published by universities of Chile
Publications established in 1972
Biannual journals
Latin American studies journals
English-language journals
Spanish-language journals